Ernest Mervyn Taylor (1906–1964) was a notable New Zealand engraver, commercial artist and publisher. He was born in Auckland, New Zealand in 1906 but primarily lived and worked in Wellington, New Zealand until his sudden death at the age of 58.

Murals
Taylor completed a number of murals towards the end of his career. Information is varied on the current status of these works: some are known to be intact, some have been boarded over, some are in need of restoration work, and the fate of others is simply unknown. These works are currently the subject of a Massey University College of Creative Arts research project, the E. Mervyn Taylor mural search & recovery project.

List of murals

Expanded information on individual murals

Taita Soil Bureau, "First Kumara Planting"
One of his commissions was a mural at the Taitā headquarters of the Department of Scientific & Industrial Research (DSIR)’s Soil Bureau depicting a cloaked figure using a kō (Māori digging stick). In the short film "Pictorial Parade No. 128", produced in 1962 by the National Film Unit, Taylor can be seen discussing the mural with Mr. Normal Taylor (Director of the Soil Bureau), and subsequently painting it.

COMPAC Building, "Te Ika-a-Māui"
The mural was commissioned by the New Zealand Government to mark the 1962 completion of the Tasman leg of the Commonwealth Pacific Cable (COMPAC) – a huge underwater telephone cable system that connected New Zealand to its Commonwealth allies in the aftermath of World War Two. The mural was originally housed in the COMPAC landing station in Auckland. In 2014 this mural was discovered by artist Bronwyn Holloway-Smith. The work was brought to public attention once again through her project Te Ika-a-Akoranga.

Other sources
 Bound to be noticed; Dominion Post, 24 Nov 2007; sup.p. 20.
 
 Prints charming : after years of marginalisation, artist E Mervyn Taylor is finally getting his due; Listener, 16 Sep 2006; v.205 n.3462:p. 40
 
 E Mervyn Taylor; Here and Now, Jan/Feb 1951; n.5:p. 38,42
 E Mervyn Taylor; Arts Year Book, 1947; n.3:p. 116-119,147

References

1906 births
1964 deaths
New Zealand publishers (people)
New Zealand artists
New Zealand designers
People from Auckland